The IEEE Frank Rosenblatt Award is  a Technical Field Award established by the Institute of Electrical and Electronics Engineers Board of Directors in 2004.  This award is presented for outstanding contributions to the advancement of the design, practice, techniques, or theory in biologically and linguistically motivated computational paradigms, including neural networks, connectionist systems, evolutionary computation, fuzzy systems, and hybrid intelligent systems in which these paradigms are contained.  

The award may be presented to an individual, multiple recipients, or a team of up to three people. It is named for Frank Rosenblatt, creator of the perceptron.

Recipients of this award receive a bronze medal, certificate, and honorarium.

Recipients 
 2021: James M. Keller
 2020: Xin Yao
 2019: Erkki Oja
 2018: Enrique H. Ruspini
 2017: Stephen Grossberg
 2016: Ronald R. Yager
 2015: Marco Dorigo
 2014: Geoffrey E. Hinton
 2013: Terrence Sejnowski
 2012: Vladimir Vapnik
 2011: Hans-Paul Schwefel
 2010: Michio Sugeno
 2009: John J. Hopfield
 2008: Teuvo Kohonen
 2007: James C. Bezdek
 2006: Lawrence J. Fogel

References

External links 
IEEE Frank Rosenblatt Award page at IEEE Computational Intelligence Society
List of IEEE Frank Rosenblatt Award recipients

Frank Rosenblatt Award